The 2012 Riyadh truck crash occurred on 1 November 2012, when a truck carrying fuel crashed into an intersection flyover in the east of Riyadh, the capital city of Saudi Arabia. The lorry hit a bridge pylon on Khureis Road and the petrol it was carrying leaked into the surroundings, and then ignited. Al Ekhbariya television reported that the blast killed 23 people outright and injured 111, with the death toll expected to rise even higher; although the Saudi health ministry reported the injury total was closer to 135. An Agence France-Presse photographer on the scene described widespread damage, with charred bodies and machinery being hauled from the wreckage. Due to the force of the blast, another truck fell off of the flyover. Amateur video showed black smoke billowing into the sky, visible throughout the city.

The scene of the crash was within close vicinity of Prince Nayef Arab University for Security Studies, as well as the headquarters of the Saudi Arabian National Guard, thus instigating the speculation of terrorist collusion or perpetration. However, a police spokesman stated that this was inexorably not the case, explaining "the truck driver was surprised by a road accident on its route, causing it to crash into one of the pillars of the bridge". The police also posited that due to it being the Eid al-Adha holiday, the casualty total was significantly less than it would have been during a normal day, because of vastly reduced traffic. The Riyadh Police also warned against congregating near the scene of the crash, as roughly 10,000 people took to doing so just an hour after the accident occurred.

On 2 November, the Saudi health ministry stated that the death toll was confirmed to have risen to 26 through the night, including Saudis, Filipinos (the lorry driver's nationality), and victims of other nationalities. The crash is expected to cost more than 300 million riyals. According to Saudi Minister of Health Abdullah bin Abdulaziz Al Rabiah, 90 of the injured have been released from the hospital, but 43 are still under intensive medical care. The driver was arrested, but the charges against him are unknown.

References

Explosions in 2012
2012 road incidents
2012 in Saudi Arabia
Explosions in Saudi Arabia
21st century in Riyadh
Fires in Saudi Arabia
Riyadh lorry crash
Road incidents in Saudi Arabia
November 2012 events in Asia
2012 disasters in Saudi Arabia
Tanker explosions